A regional conference of representatives  was a type of governance in an administrative region of Quebec.

The CREs were primarily responsible for advising the Government of Quebec on issues in their respective regions and implementing projects assigned to them by the government. As such, they were acting as both interlocutors as well as agents. 

They had no taxation or management powers in their respective regions. They worked with various political and socioeconomic partners, including the regional departments and agencies in Quebec, the regional county municipalities, the local development centres and development corporations that operated in the region.

Originally Quebec was divided into 19 CREs, with complete territorial coverage: one for each of the administrative regions, except for Montérégie which had three. Today there are more than 21 organisations, if first nations are included.

CREs were abolished in 2016.

List of CREs 

CRE – Bas-Saint-Laurent (01) - Rimouski : Regional conference of representatives of Bas-Saint-Laurent 
()
CRE – Saguenay–Lac-Saint-Jean (02) - Jonquière : Regional conference of representatives of Saguenay-Lac-Saint-Jean 
()
CRE – Capitale-Nationale (03) - Québec : Regional conference of representatives of Capitale-Nationale
CRE – Mauricie (04) - Trois-Rivières : Regional conference of representatives of Mauricie 
()
Conseil de la Nation Atikamekw
CRE – Estrie (05) - Sherbrooke : Regional conference of representatives of Estrie 
()
CRE – Montreal (06) - Urban agglomeration of Montreal : Regional conference of representatives of Montreal 
()
CRE – Outaouais (07) - Gatineau : Regional conference of representatives of Outaouais 
()
CRE – Abitibi-Témiscamingue (08) - Rouyn-Noranda : Regional conference of elected officers of Abitibi-Témiscamingue 
()
Algonquin Nation Programs and Services Secretariat
CRE – Côte-Nord (09) - Baie-Comeau : Regional conference of representatives of Côte-Nord 
()
Nord-du-Québec (10)
CRE – Baie-James Eeyou Istchee James Bay Territory (Matagami)
Grand Council of the Crees Gouvernement de la nation crie (Nemaska)
Kativik Regional Government Administration régionale Kativik (Kuujjuaq)	
CRE – Gaspésie-Îles-de-la-Madeleine (11) - Gaspé : Regional conference of representatives of Gaspésie-Îles-de-la-Madeleine 
()
Mi'gmawei Mawiomi Secretariat
CRE – Chaudière-Appalaches (12) - Montmagny : Regional conference of representatives of Chaudière-Appalaches 
()
CRE – Laval (13) - Laval : Regional conference of representatives of Laval
CRE – Lanaudière (14) - Joliette : Regional conference of representatives of Lanaudière 
()
CRE – Laurentides (15) - Saint-Jérôme : Regional conference of representatives of Laurentides 
()
Montérégie (16)
CRE – Agglomération de Longueuil: Regional conference of representatives of the urban agglomeration of Longueuil (Longueuil) 
CRE – Montérégie Est Regional conference of representatives of Montérégie Est (McMasterville)
 includes Brome-Missisquoi, La Haute-Yamaska, Acton, Pierre-De Saurel, Les Maskoutains, Rouville, Le Haut-Richelieu, La Vallée-du-Richelieu, Marguerite-D'Youville regional county municipalities
CRE – Vallée-du-Haut-Saint-Laurent Regional conference of representatives of Vallée-du-Haut-Saint-Laurent (Salaberry-de-Valleyfield)
 includes Roussillon, Les Jardins-de-Napierville, Le Haut-Saint-Laurent, Beauharnois-Salaberry, Vaudreuil-Soulanges regional county municipalities
CRE – Centre-du-Québec (17) - Drummondville : Regional conference of representatives of Centre-du-Québec 
()

See also
Regions of Quebec

References

External links
 
 Maps
 Presidents' contact
Political history of Quebec
Local government in Quebec
Subdivisions of Quebec
Administrative regions of Quebec